Irene Claremont de Castillejo (born in London, 1885 – died in London 1967) was a writer and Jungian analyst. She is remembered especially for her posthumously published classic text, Knowing Woman: A Feminine Psychology, (1973).

Biography 
Irene Claremont de Castillejo was a graduate of Cambridge University in History and Economics. In 1922 she married the jurist and professor of education, . They went to live in Spain in her husband's home in Madrid, 'Olivar de Castillejo', at Chamartín, presently known as the 'Olivar de Castillejo Foundation'. They had four children, Jacinta, Leonardo, David and Sorrel.

In 1936 with the out-break of the Spanish Civil War the family moved to England, followed by a stay in Switzerland, and again back to England in 1939 on account of the German invasion of Europe.

Following the death of her husband in London in 1945, Irene began her studies in Jungian psychology in Zurich working with Carl Gustav Jung, Emma Jung and Toni Wolff. On her return to London, she established a psychotherapy practice specialising in the role of women in the world of today.

Irene died in London in 1967.

Works 
 Knowing Woman. A Feminine Psychology
 Freedom of the city
 I Married a Stranger

"Knowing Woman" 
Her classic text, originally published in 1973, has been re-issued in several editions since. It is a distillation of her wisdom garnered through life experience and her work as a therapist. She expresses herself thus:

See also

References

Bibliography

External links 
 In Spanish Irene Claremont de Castillejo, una analista junguiana en nuestra historia

1885 births
1967 deaths
20th-century British women writers
20th-century British writers
Alumni of the University of Cambridge
British expatriates in Spain
British non-fiction writers
Feminist psychologists
Jungian psychologists
New Age writers
Writers from London
British psychoanalysts
20th-century non-fiction writers